Hemlock is an unincorporated community in Tillamook County, in the U.S. state of Oregon. Beaver Creek, a tributary of the Nestucca River, flows through Hemlock.

According to Oregon Geographic Names, the community was named for the western hemlock tree, "which grows in great abundance in the Coast Range." The post office in Hemlock operated from 1906 to 1921.

References

Unincorporated communities in Tillamook County, Oregon
Unincorporated communities in Oregon